Former pupils of Warwick School  are known as Old Warwickians.

Since the school's origins over 1100 years ago, many old boys have made a significant influence on their chosen fields. Especially in the past two centuries, old boys have made their mark in the military, politics, sports, science, the music industry and the entertainment industry.

Notable Old Warwickians

Notable Old Warwickians are listed below along with their contribution to society:

Politics
 Daniel Byles (Guinness World Record holding ocean rower and polar explorer, Conservative MP for North Warwickshire from 2010) 1985 - 1992, Head of House
 Harry Greenway (Conservative MP for Ealing 1979–1997)
 Colin Jordan (National Organiser of the British National Party) 1934 – 1942
 Stephen Lovegrove, Permanent Secretary of the Ministry of Defence
 Frederick Mulley (politician) 1929 – 1936
 Thomas Puckering 1592 - 1636, MP and Sheriff of Warwickshire
 Tim Barrow (British diplomat)
 Steven Fisher (British diplomat)
 Daniel Dalton (Conservative politician and former professional cricketer)
 Tony Whittaker, co-founder and first leader of PEOPLE, forerunner of the Green Party

Religion
 Abiezer Coppe (17th century "ranting" Baptist preacher) c. 1630
 John Ley 1584 - 1662, clergyman and religious controversialist
 Henry Teonge (c. 1620–1690), diarist, naval chaplain and Warwickshire parson
 John Richardson (Archbishop of Fredericton)

Sport
 A G K Brown (Olympic gold medalist, 1936) head boy, 1933 – 1934
 Tim Dalton English Rugby Union International
 Jamie Elson Member of the winning UK&I Walker Cup Golf Team defeating the US in 2001
 Christian Horner (Team Principal - Red Bull Racing) 1987 - 1992
 Ben Howard (Rugby Union Player - Worcester Warriors)
 Robert Challoner (Australian rugby union player)
 John Hacking (Cricketer for Warwickshire)
 Jack Marshall Cricketer for Warwickshire)
 Ward Maule (Indian-born English cricketer and clergyman)
 Marko Stanojevic (Italian rugby union player of Serbian descent)
 Chris Whiteside (Cricketer for Middlesex)

Entertainment
 Sabine Baring-Gould (author of Onward, Christian Soldiers), 1846
 Eric Hope (concert pianist) 1928 - 1931
 Denis Matthews (concert pianist) 1932 - 1936
 Rod Thomas (Musician, Bright Light Bright Light)
 Michael Billington (author, critic & broadcaster)
 John Camkin, (1922-1998) journalist, TV sports presenter and businessman
 Simon Cheshire, (1977-1982) children's writer
 Marc Elliott (actor, EastEnders)
 Charles Piff (alias Charles Kay (Actor)) 1942-1948
 John Masefield (Poet Laureate) 1888 – 1891
 Iain Pears (novelist)
 M J Trow (writer)
 John McLusky (Hector John Dewhirst McLusky) 1936 - 40, James Bond illustrator
 Ben Hanlin (Magician)
 Joshua McGuire (Actor)
 James TW Singer, Songwriter
 Ferdinand Kingsley Actor (Son of Sir Ben Kingsley)
 Edward Chattaway (Journalist and editor of The Star from 1930 to 1936)
 Francis Wilford-Smith (British cartoonist, graphic artist, and producer and archivist of blues music)
 Mark Evans, TV Presenter
 Robin Rhoderick-Jones (Author)

Science
 Robert Thomson Leiper, parasitologist and helminthologist
 Josiah Court, English physician who determined the cause of miners' nystagmus
 Alfred Nicholson Leeds, English amateur paleontologist
 Geoff Wilde, British engineer and the designer of the Rolls-Royce RB211

Industry
 Geoffrey Healey (co-designer, with his father Donald Healey, of Healey and Austin-Healey cars) 1937 - 1939
 William James (railway promoter) c. 1785
Denys Shortt (Businessman)

Military
 Air Commodore Peter J. M. Squires, senior RAF officer
 Peter Strickland (British Lieutenant-General in WWI)
  Brigadier Robin Rhoderick Jones, late Queen's Royal Irish Hussars
  Brigadier Michael Stephens, late Royal Engineers
  Lieutenant Commander Anthony Pimm, ex-Commanding Officer of HMS Chiddingfold

Other
 Sir David Foskett (High Court judge)
 John Owen headmaster c. 1595 – 1622
 Martin Richards, Chief Constable of Sussex Police
Peter Jones 1958–1964. Gambler and playboy

References

People from Warwick